The Defua rat (Dephomys defua) is a species of rodent in the family Muridae.
It is found in Ivory Coast, Ghana, Guinea, Liberia, and Sierra Leone.
Its natural habitats are subtropical or tropical moist lowland forests, subtropical or tropical swamps, and subtropical or tropical moist montane forests.

References

Dephomys
Rodents of Africa
Mammals described in 1900
Taxonomy articles created by Polbot